There are a few places named Sodus in the United States:

Sodus, New York
Sodus (village), New York
Sodus Point, New York
Sodus Township (disambiguation)
Sodus Bay, a bay on the south shore of Lake Ontario, Wayne County, New York